Cloud Sherpas was a cloud computing advisory and technology services company. Founded in 2008 and headquartered in Atlanta, Georgia, it was acquired by Accenture in 2015.

History 

Cloud Sherpas was founded by Michael Cohn, Eran Gil, and David Hoff in May 2008. Cloud Sherpas was a Google Enterprise partner and reseller and implementation partner for Google Apps from 2010 to 2015.

In March 2012, led by a $20 million investment by Columbia Capital, Cloud Sherpas merged with GlobalOne, a Salesforce.com partner. The combined entity went forward with the name Cloud Sherpas, which became a platform upon which additional cloud advisory boutiques and brokerage firms were later added. Global One was founded by John Orrock, Dennis Wall, and Toan Huynh. In 2013, Cloud Sherpas ranked No. 68 on the Inc magazine Hire Power Awards 2013 list. According to Inc, the firm created over 50,000 jobs in a span of 18 months.

Other notable Cloud Sherpas acquisitions include:
Omnetic (June 2011): A San Francisco-based Google Apps provider.
WaveAdept (July 2011): A New Zealand-based Google Apps provider.
Beloit Solutions Group: (July 2011): A Google Apps cloud services provider from Kansas.
Devnet (July 2011): A Google Apps reseller headquartered in Brisbane.
CloudTrigger (December 2012): A California-based consultancy focused on implementation and customization of cloud based CRM.
Innoveer Solutions (January 2013): A customer relationship management software provider with a particular emphasis on Salesforce.
Navigis (January 2013): Provider of ServiceNow integration services.
Stoneburn (2013): Provider of Google Apps resale and integration services in UK.

Notable recognition 

 Cloud Sherpas appeared three times on the Inc.500 list of fastest-growing privately held companies in the United States. It ranked No. 142 in 2013, No. 458 in 2014 and No. 379 in 2015.
 Cloud Sherpas won the Atlanta Business Chronicle’s Pacesetter Award three times, earning the top spot in 2014. Chris Arroyo, CFO of Cloud Sherpas, was also honored by the Atlanta Business Chronicle in 2014, winning CFO Of The Year in the medium-sized private company category.
 The Atlanta Business Chronicle ranked Cloud Sherpas No. 33 on its Best Places to Work list in 2011.
 CRN Magazine has featured Cloud Sherpas on its Solution Provider 500 list twice (No. 236 in 2013 and No. 160 in 2014). In 2013, Cloud Sherpas also earned the top spot on the CRN Fast Growth 150, followed by a No. 4 spot in 2014.

See also
Comparison of office suites
Comparison of email clients
Online office suite

References

External links
 
 

Information technology consulting firms of the United States
Companies based in Atlanta